Abel was a son of Adam and Eve in the Bible. According to the Bible, he was the first person to die, murdered by his brother Cain.

Abel may also refer to:

People and fictional characters
 Abel (given name), including a list of people and fictional characters
 Abel (surname)
 Niels Henrik Abel, a Norwegian mathematician

Places
 Mount Abel (British Columbia), Canada
 Abel Lake, New Zealand
 Abel, Alabama, United States, an unincorporated community
 Mount Abel, former name of Cerro Noroeste, California, United States
 Abel Nunatak, a nunatak in Antarctica
 Abel (אבעל), Yiddish name of the municipality of Obeliai, Lithuania
 Abel (crater), an impact crater on the Moon

Science and technology
 Abel (hominid), the name given to the only specimen of Australopithecus bahrelghazali
 Abel Prize, an annual prize in mathematics
 Advanced Boolean Expression Language, hardware description language for developing programmable logic devices
 Abel, a piece of change ringing software

Music
 Abel (band), an American rock band
ABEL, an album by Abel Pintos
 Abel (EP), EP by Japanese rock band Unsraw
 "Abel", a single by The National from Alligator
 "Abel Tesfaye", known professionally as The Weeknd, is a Canadian Singer

Other uses
 Tropical Storm Abel, from the 1996 Pacific typhoon season
 Abel (1986 film), a Dutch drama film
 Abel (2010 film), a Mexican comedy film
 Abel Stadium, a sports stadium for Nebraska Wesleyan University in Lincoln, Nebraska
 Abel, Inc., a Japan-based Dreamcast video game developer and publisher, founded in 1997

See also
 Abelson, a surname
 Abell (disambiguation)
 Abele (disambiguation)
 Abels (disambiguation)
 Abelian (disambiguation)
 Able (disambiguation)
 Abil, a village in central Syria
 Cain and Abel (disambiguation)
 Saint Abel (disambiguation)